The Case of Sergeant Grischa is a 1930 American pre-Code drama film directed by Herbert Brenon, based on the German novel of the same name by Arnold Zweig. John Tribby was nominated for an Academy Award for Best Sound Recording. No known copy of this film exists and is considered lost, the only sound film to have won an Oscar and subsequently suffered this fate.

Plot
Sergeant Grischa Paprotkin of the Imperial Russian Army has been captured by the Imperial German Army during World War I, and is interned in a prisoner-of-war camp. When his chance comes to escape, he takes it, ending up staying with a young Russian refugee, Babka. However, after a time, he longs to return to his home in Russia. Babka, even though she has fallen in love with him, agrees to help him. Since he cannot travel under his real name, being an escaped POW, Babka obtains the credentials of a dead Russian soldier, Bjuscheff.

After leaving Babka's, on his way back to his home in Russia, he stops at a friend of Babka's, who lives in Mervinsk. When a German soldier arrives at the house, Grischa hides in the basement. As he is about to leave, the soldier notices the Russian soldier's cap which Grischa has dropped on his way to the cellar. Grischa is captured, after which it is discovered that his false identity is that of a Russian spy, for which he is sentenced to execution.

While in captivity, Grischa's real identity is uncovered, but the German command refuses to reverse his sentence. Babka and her friends make plans to help him escape once again, at the same time as a powerful general in the German army, von Lychow, hears about his case and decides to intercede on his behalf. Grischa refuses the help of Babka, putting his trust with von Lychow. When von Lychow meets with the German Commander-in-Chief, General Schieffenzahn, they argue over Grischa's case, von Lychow pleading for leniency, while Schieffenzahn wanting the execution to go forward as soon as possible. They end their argument without seeing eye-to-eye, but after von Lychow departs, Schieffenzahn changes his mind and sends an order to cancel the execution. However, a storm has caused the wires to be down, and the message never arrives. Grischa is executed by firing squad.

Cast
As per AFI:
 Chester Morris as Sergeant Grischa Paprotkin
 Betty Compson as Babka
 Alec B. Francis as General von Lychow
 Gustav von Seyffertitz as General Schieffenzahn
 Jean Hersholt as Posnanski
 Leyland Hodgson as Lieutenant Winfried (as Layland Hodgson)
 Paul McAllister as Corporal Sacht (as Paul MacAllister)
 Raymond Whitaker as Aljoscha
 Bernard Siegel as Verressjeff
 Frank McCormack as Captain Spierauge / Kolja
 Percy Barbette as Sergeant Fritz
 Hal Davis as Birkholz

Reception
The film lost an estimated $170,000.  Mordaunt Hall, The New York Times film critic, gave the film a lukewarm review. John E. Tribby received an Oscar nomination for Best Sound for this film.

References

External links
 
 

1930 films
1930 drama films
American drama films
American black-and-white films
1930s English-language films
Films about capital punishment
Films based on German novels
Films directed by Herbert Brenon
Lost American films
Military courtroom films
RKO Pictures films
World War I films set on the Eastern Front
1930s American films